The 2008 Prix de l'Arc de Triomphe was a horse race held at Longchamp on Sunday 5 October 2008. It was the 87th running of the Prix de l'Arc de Triomphe.

The winner was Zarkava, a three-year-old filly trained in France by Alain de Royer-Dupré. The winning jockey was Christophe Soumillon.

Zarkava had been a doubtful runner because of the soft ground at Longchamp. Her participation was confirmed just before the start.

Race details
 Sponsor: Qatar Racing and Equestrian Club
 Purse: €4,000,000; First prize: €2,285,600 
 Going: Good to Soft
 Distance: 2,400 metres
 Number of runners: 16
 Winner's time: 2m 28.8s

Full result

 Abbreviations: dh = dead-heat; shd = short-head; hd = head; nk = neck; dist = distance

Winner's details
Further details of the winner, Zarkava.
 Sex: Filly
 Foaled: 31 March 2005
 Country: Ireland
 Sire: Zamindar; Dam: Zarkasha (Kahyasi)
 Owner / Breeder: HH Aga Khan IV

References

External links
 Colour Chart – Arc 2008

Prix de l'Arc de Triomphe
 2008
Prix de l'Arc de Triomphe
Prix de l'Arc de Triomphe
Prix de l'Arc de Triomphe